The 2017–18 Nationale 1 (56th edition), Algeria's top tier basketball club competition, ran from October 12, 2017 through May ?, 2018. for the 2017–18 season, which will start one week late due to the difficulties encountered by the clubs, both administratively and financially, we will find the usual leaders of the title race, namely GS Pétroliers, holder (Championship and Cup) and main favorite for his own succession, which will have NA Hussein-Dey (Runner-up), CRB Dar Beida and US Setif as main competitors.

Concerning the formula of competition, the leaders of the Fédération Algérienne de Basket-Ball (FABB) decided to regroup the 16 teams in a single pool in the first phase (against two groups the previous season) and will compete round-trip. At the end of this phase, the eight best teams in the standings will play the play-offs in three tournaments in the top three in the standings, the first two, after the play-offs, will animate the final of the championship which will be played in two games winners on neutral ground, another novelty for this season, the introduction of technical statistics for the National 1.

Venues and locations
Notes

Regular Season (October 12, 2017 - May 1, 2018)

 Note: Small number and number in brackets indicate round number and leg, respectively Next scheduled games

Regular season standings
Updated as of 1 May 2018

 1 loss by default (no point awarded)
 2 loss by default (no point awarded)
 Advance to play-offs

Play-offs 2018

First tournament (US Sétif)

Second Tournament (CRB Dar Beida)

Third Tournament (GS Pétroliers)

Play-off standings

 Advance to championship Final

Play-down (May 11–26, 2018)

First tournament (PS El Eulma)

Second Tournament (USM Alger)

Third Tournament (OS Bordj Bou Arréridj)

Play-down standings

 Relegated to Nationale B

2018 National 1 Finals

References

External links 
 Algerian Basketball Federation official website
 Algerian Basketball - Afrobasket.com 

Algerian Basketball Championship seasons
League
Algeria